Langelurillus manifestus is a jumping spider species in the genus Langelurillus that lives in Tanzania. The species, which was first described in 2000, is closely related to Langelurillus rufus, with which it shares morphological characteristics.

References

Endemic fauna of Tanzania
Fauna of Tanzania
Salticidae
Spiders described in 2000
Spiders of Africa
Taxa named by Wanda Wesołowska